Valeron or Valerón may refer to:

Caves of Valerón, caves in Gran Canary
Hortensia Valerón, Cuban vocalist (soprano)
Irene Valerón, Spanish model
Juan Carlos Valerón, Spanish footballer
Muhammad Valeron, Indonesian footballer
Skylark of Valeron, science fiction novel
Valéron Strength Films, a polyethylene film manufacturer
Valeron, a brand name of paracetamol